Wang Yi (born May 25, 1973) is a Chinese volleyball player who twice went to the Olympic games with the Chinese team, in 1992 and 1996. She shared in the silver medal earned by that team at the 1996 Summer Olympics in Atlanta, Georgia. Educated at Notre Dame de Namur University in Belmont, California, Wang earned a bachelor's degree in business administration in 2002. She has since served as an assistant coach at Pennsylvania State University, Rutgers University and Columbia University, where she has been employed since 2008.

References

1973 births
Living people
Chinese women's volleyball players
Olympic volleyball players of China
Olympic silver medalists for China
Olympic medalists in volleyball
Medalists at the 1996 Summer Olympics
Volleyball players at the 1992 Summer Olympics
Volleyball players at the 1996 Summer Olympics
Asian Games medalists in volleyball
Volleyball players at the 1994 Asian Games
Notre Dame de Namur University alumni
American volleyball coaches
Columbia Lions women's volleyball coaches
Medalists at the 1994 Asian Games
Asian Games silver medalists for China
Penn State Nittany Lions women's volleyball coaches
Rutgers Scarlet Knights women's volleyball coaches
20th-century Chinese women